Blundon is an unincorporated community in Kanawha County, West Virginia, United States.

The community has the name of Major Edgar B. Blundon, a Civil War veteran.

References 

Unincorporated communities in West Virginia
Unincorporated communities in Kanawha County, West Virginia